The usual judgment is a single-winner electoral system invented by Adrien Fabre, a French social scientist, in 2019. It is a highest median voting method, a system of cardinal voting in which the winner is decided by the median rather than the mean.

Just like the majority judgment, the usual judgment uses verbal appreciations − Bad, Inadequate, Passable, Fair, Good, Very Good, Excellent − rather than numerical to evaluates the candidates or options.

However, the usual judgment uses a more reliable method to break ties between candidates.

Presentation 
The elector gives a verbal appreciation to each candidate among a common scale, such as:

An elector can give the same appreciation to several different candidates. A candidate not evaluated automatically receives the mention "Bad".

When counting the votes, the appreciations received are added up for each candidate and the share of each appreciation in the votes cast is presented. This is the candidate's "merit profile":

This is presented graphically in the form of a cumulative histogram whose total corresponds to 100% of the votes cast:

For each candidate, we determine the majority grade: it is the unique appreciation which obtain the absolute majority of the electors against any inferior appreciation, and the absolute majority or equality against any superior appreciation.

In practice, when the number of electors is uneven in the form 2N+1, the  majority grade is the appreciation given by the elector N+1. When the number of elector is even in the form 2N, the  majority grade is the appreciation given the elector N.

This rule means that the absolute majority (strictly more than 50%) of the electors judges that a candidates merits at least its  majority grade, and that the half or more (50% or more) of the electors judges that he deserves at the most its majority grade. Thus, the majority grade looks like a median.

The elected candidate is the candidate who obtains the best majority grade.

The tie-breaking method 

When several candidates obtains the same  majority grade, a tie-breaking formula must be used. It's this formula which distinguishes the usual judgement from the other highest median voting rules such as the majority judgment.

 The  majority grade of a candidate  is noted .
For example, all the electors who rated a candidate as "Excellent", "Very Good" or "Good", while his or her  majority grade is "Fair".
For example, all the electors who rated a candidate as "Bad", "Inadequate" or "Passable", while his or her  majority grade is "Fair".

The usual judgment orders the candidates according to the following formula:

Namely: "the difference between the share of proponents and the share of opponents, divided by the share of electors who have given the majority grade".

Example 
Take the example given above.

Candidates A and B both obtain the majority grade "Fair". With the tie-breaking formula, candidate A obtains the score  : "Fair -0.073" and candidate B the score  : "Fair -0.443".

Since −0.073 > -0.443, candidate A obtains the highest score and wins the election.

Additional tie-breaking 
If the tie-breaking formula shown above does not allow determining a single winner (if several candidates obtain exactly the same score), a complementary tie-breaking score shall be calculated for the remaining candidates. It is done by replacing the proponents and opponents of each candidate by their "successors".

We start again as follows, until a single winner is designated, by replacing in the formula the share of successors used ( and ) by the share of their respective successors ( and ).

If, after all those steps, a tie persists, then we rank the remaining candidates following the lexicographic order of their vector  where  is the number of grades that can be attributed (in the example above ). If this ultimate comparison fails to designate a single winner, it implies that the remaining candidates have obtained exactly the same grade repartition - an extremely improbable situation.

Properties and advantages 
As an electoral system, the usual judgment shows advantages shared with the other highest-median voting rules such as the majority judgment. It also possesses advantages specific to its tie-breaking formula.

Advantages commons to the highest-median rules 
The verbal appreciations are easy to understand and have a common meaning for all voters. There is no possible confusion on the meaning of a "5" or a "4", as can be the case with score voting.

The elector can grade each candidate individually and give the same appreciation to several candidates − a major advantage over the first-round or two-round vote, and ranked voting systems such as the Borda count and the alternative vote.

Several candidates belonging to a similar political faction can participate in the election without harming each other.

The elector can evaluate each candidate with great nuance. This distinguishes the usual judgment from approval voting, which allows only two answers.

The application of the median encourages the sincerity of the vote over tactical voting. Cardinal voting with verbal appreciations is less manipulable than Score voting.

The "merit profile" drawn from the results gives very detailed information on the popularity of each candidate or option across the whole electorate.

Because the usual judgment asks voters to evaluate the candidates rather than to rank them, it escapes Arrow's impossibility theorem. It also escapes Condorcet's paradox, as it is always able to designate a winner.

Similarity of results 
From a sample of 187 pairs of candidates, issued from real surveys, Adrien Fabre made the following observations:

 The usual judgment gives the same winner as majority judgment in 97.9% of the cases.
 The usual judgment gives the same winner as a calculation of the mean in 97.3% of the cases.

Specific advantages of the usual judgment 
The tie-breaking formula of the usual judgment presents specific advantages over the other highest-median voting rules.

Better integration of the minority voices 
The tie-breaking formula of the usual judgment takes into account all minority grades ( and  ), whereas majority judgment only considers the largest share of electors which did not give the majority grade to the candidate.

Lesser sensitivity to small fluctuations 
The usual judgment is less sensitive to minute variations than majority judgment and typical judgment. A small fluctuation in the results is less likely to change the winner of the election.

This property makes the usual judgment a more robust voting method in the face of accusations of fraud or demands of a recount of all votes. A small difference of votes being less likely to change the outcome of the election, the candidates are less encouraged to abusively contest the results.

Continuity    
The function defined by the usual judgment tie-breaking formula is continuous, whereas the functions of majority judgment and typical judgment lose continuity when variations in the results occur.

Monotonicity   
The function defined by the usual judgment tie-breaking formula is monotonic. Any augmentation of the share of proponents  will improve the score  of the candidate. Any augmentation of the share of opponents  will degrade the score  of the candidate.

The elector can not disadvantage its favourite candidate by ameliorating its grade, as it can be the case with other voting systems.

Drawbacks 
The tie-breaking formula seems relatively complex at first glance. The choice of this formula rests on mathematical considerations little known to the public. The typical judgment is a simpler alternative highest median voting rule.

The calculation of final score requires a computer or calculator. However, many national elections already depend on calculations from computer spreadsheets, after the centralization of the polling places’ official results.

See also 

 Majority judgment
 Highest median voting rules
 Range voting

References 

Electoral systems